The men's 69 kilograms event at the 2014 Asian Games took place on 22 September 2014 at Moonlight Festival Garden Weightlifting Venue.

Schedule
All times are Korea Standard Time (UTC+09:00)

Records

Results 
Legend
NM — No mark

New records
The following records were established during the competition.

References

External links
 Official website

Weightlifting at the 2014 Asian Games